Solitaire is a 2008 independent coming-of-age drama film from director Victor Franko (Frank D'Agostino) and Rand Alan Sabatini of Rand Alan Studios with a cast of 10.

Premise
A story of thievery and lengths that a group of young criminals will go through in order to do exactly that. Stars legendary actress Marilyn Chambers

Cast
 Marilyn Chambers as Cop
 Short Sleeve Sampson as Morris
 Anthony Goes as "Smog"
 Nicholas Jandl as Riche
 Alex Fraioli as "Blondy"
 Kenny Harris as Joey
 James Margelony as Roger
 Juliana Fraioli as Ruby
 Tony Lepore as himself
 Dave Kane as Radio Host

External links

"Solitaire MySpace"
The Sun Chronicle / "Attleboro High grad turns short story into horror movie"

2008 films
2000s coming-of-age drama films
2008 drama films
2000s English-language films